Sciades paucus is a species of catfish in the family Ariidae. It was described by Patricia J. Kailola in 2000, originally under the genus Arius. It inhabits freshwaters in Australia.

The species epithet "paucus" is derived from the Latin term for "less", and refers to the species bearing fewer gill rakers than those of Neoarius midgleyi (referred to as "Arius midgleyi").

References

Ariidae
Taxa named by Patricia J. Kailola
Fish described in 2000